The 6th World Festival of Youth and Students featured an athletics competition among its programme of events. The events were contested in Moscow, Soviet Union in August 1957. Mainly contested among Eastern European athletes, it served as an alternative to the more Western European-oriented 1957 World University Games held in Paris the same year in September.

Many top Soviet athletes were present and the event and the nation won the most titles. Pyotr Bolotnikov won the 10,000 metres – a feat which preceded a 1960 Olympic win at the distance. Semyon Rzhishchin, the steeplechase world record holder, won his specialist event, but Olympic walking champion Leonid Spirin settled for runner-up spot. In the triple jump, Leonid Shcherbakov failed an attempt to win a fifth straight title at the festival, being beaten by two-time and reigning Olympic champion Adhemar da Silva, who claimed Brazil's first gold in festival history. Javelin thrower Janusz Sidło won a fourth straight world student title and his throw of  marked the only time an athlete surpassed eighty metres at the competition. Yugoslavia was prominently represented by Franjo Mihalić, the Olympic runner-up and marathon winner here.

In women's events, former Olympic champion Galina Zybina won the shot put for a second time running, while in the discus her compatriot and fellow Olympic champion Nina Ponomaryova won her fourth straight gold at the festival. Also among the strong Soviet throwers were javelin specialist Inese Jaunzeme and Tamara Tyshkevich (both reigning Olympic champions). Iolanda Balaș had her third straight world student win in the high jump. She went on to win at the 1958 European Athletics Championships a year later, as did pentathlon winner Galina Bystrova and 800 m runner-up Yelizaveta Yermolayeva.

Medal summary

Men

Women

Medal table

References

Results
World Student Games (UIE). GBR Athletics. Retrieved on 2014-12-09.

World Festival of Youth and Students
World Festival of Youth and Students
World Festival of Youth and Students
Sports competitions in Moscow
1957
International athletics competitions hosted by the Soviet Union
1957 World Festival